In cricket, a five-wicket haul (also known as a "five–for" or "fifer") refers to a bowler taking five or more wickets in a single innings. This is regarded by critics as a notable achievement, and fewer than 50 bowlers have taken 15 or more five-wicket hauls at international level in their cricketing careers. Danish Kaneria, a right-arm leg spinner, represented the Pakistan national cricket team in 61 Tests between 2000 and 2010. He took 15 five-wicket hauls during his career in international cricket. Kaneria was described by the BBC as a "match-winner with his leg-breaks".

Kaneria made his Test debut in 2000 against England at the Iqbal Stadium, Faisalabad. His first Test five-wicket haul came the following year against Bangladesh at the Multan Cricket Stadium during the 2001–02 Asian Test Championship. Kaneria went on to take his second five-wicket haul in the same match, the only instance in his career where he did so. He accumulated 12 wickets for 94 runs in the match, and the performance earned him the man of the match award. Kaneria's best bowling figures in an innings were 7 wickets for 77 runs against Bangladesh at the Bangabandhu National Stadium, Dhaka, in January 2002. He was most successful against Australia and Bangladesh, claiming three five-wicket hauls against each of them.

Having made his One Day International (ODI) debut in 2001 against Zimbabwe at the Sharjah Cricket Stadium, Kaneria played 18 matches for Pakistan and took 15 wickets in the format. His best bowling figures in ODIs were 3 wickets for 31 runs against New Zealand at the Rangiri Dambulla International Stadium in 2003. Kaneria never played Twenty20 International matches. , he has taken 15 five-wicket hauls in international cricket; he ranks seventh in the list for Pakistan in all formats of the game combined.

Key

Test cricket five-wicket hauls

Notes

References

External links
 
 

Kaneria
Kaneira, Danesh